The 1982 Australian Sports Car Championship was a CAMS sanctioned Australian motor racing title open to Group A Sports Cars. It was the fourteenth Australian Sports Car Championship, and the first to be contested by Group A cars since 1975. The championship was won by Chris Clearihan of Canberra, driving a Kaditcha.

Schedule

The championship was contested over a four-round series.

Class structure
Cars competed in two classes:
 Under 2.5 litres
 Over 2.5 litres

Points system
Championship points were awarded at each round on a 9-6-4-3-2-1 basis for the first six places in each class, Additional points were awarded on a 4-3-2-1 basis for the first four outright places, irrespective of class.

For rounds which were contested over two heats, drivers were allocated points on a 20-16-13-11-10-9-8-7-6-5-4-3-2-1 basis for the first 14 places in each heat, with the points from the two heats aggregated to determine the round result. Championship points where then awarded based on that round result.

Results

References

Australian Sports Car Championship
Sports Car Championship